Rolf Singer (June 23, 1906 – January 18, 1994) was a German-born mycologist and one of the most important taxonomists of gilled mushrooms (agarics) in the 20th century.

He wrote major books like "The Agaricales in Modern Taxonomy". He fled to various countries during the Nazi period, pursuing mycology in far-flung places like the Soviet Union, Argentina, and finally the United States, as mycologist at the Field Museum in Chicago.

Biography 
After receiving his Ph.D. at the University of Vienna in 1931 he worked in Munich. By 1933, however, Singer left Germany for Vienna due to the political deterioration in Germany. There he met his wife, Martha Singer. From Vienna, Singer and his wife went to Barcelona, Spain, where Singer was appointed assistant professor at the Autonomous University of Barcelona. Persecution by the Spanish authorities on behalf of the German government forced Singer to leave Spain for France in 1934. After a fellowship at the Museum d'Histoire Naturelle in Paris, Singer again moved, this time to Leningrad, where he was Senior Scientific Expert at the Botanical Garden of the Academy of Sciences of the USSR. During his time at the Academy, Singer made many expeditions to Siberia, the Altai Mountains, and Karelia. In 1941, Singer emigrated to the United States. He was offered a position at Harvard University's Farlow Herbarium as a research associate, then as Assistant Curator, then as acting Curator following the death of Dr. David Linder. He spent a total of seven years at the Farlow. During this time, Singer also received a Guggenheim Fellowship for studies in Florida, and taught at the Mountain Lake Biological Station of the University of Virginia.

In 1948, Singer left Harvard to become professor at the Universidad Nacional de Tucuman in Argentina. Later, in 1961, Singer became professor at the Universidad de Buenos Aires. During his time in South America, Singer, his wife, and his daughter Heidi collected extensively. Singer's last faculty appointment was at the University of Illinois at Chicago, from 1968 to 1977.

Singer was a prolific writer, with more than 400 publications to his name. He was also known for his eagerness to aid other mycologists, whether they were professionals or amateurs.

Honours
He has been honoured in the naming of several taxa of fungi. Including; Singeriella  in 1959 (in Vizellaceae family), Singera  1960 (Vermiculariopsiellaceae family), Mesosingeria  (Fossil, order Cycadales), Singeromyces  (in the family Boletaceae),
Singerina  (in the family Agaricaceae), and lastly, Singerocomus  (Boletaceae family).

Further reading
The Agaricales in modern taxonomy  by Rolf Singer (Koeltz Scientific Books)
A monograph on the genus Leucopaxillus Boursier by Rolf Singer (University of Michigan Press], 1943)
Mycoflora Australis. by Rolf Singer(J.Cramer, 1969)
Omphalinae (Clitocybeae-Tricholomataceae Basidiomycetes). by Rolf Singer (Published for Organization of Flora Neotropica by Hafner Pub. Co., 1970)
The Boletineae of Mexico and Central America III by Rolf Singer (J. Cramer, 1991)
The Boletineae of Mexico and Central America by Rolf Singer (J. Cramer, 1990)
The Agaricales in modern taxonomy by Rolf Singer (Koeltz Scientific Books, 1986)
The ectotrophically mycorrhizal fungi of the neotropical lowlands, especially Central Amazonia by Rolf Singer (J. Cramer, 1983)
Hydropus (Basidiomycetes, Tricholomataceae, Myceneae) by Rolf Singer(New York Botanical Garden, 1982)
Omphalinae (Clitocybeae-Tricholomataceae Basidiomycetes). by Rolf Singer (Published for Organization for Flora Neotropica by Hafner Pub. Co., 1970)
Strobilomycetaceae (Basidiomycetes). by Rolf Singer (Published for Organization for Flora Neotropica by Hafner Pub. Co., 1970)
The Boletineae of Florida by Rolf Singer (J. Cramer, 1977)
Marasmieae (Basidiomycetes-Tricholomataceae) by Rolf Singer (Published for Organization for Flora Neotropica by the New York Botanical Garden, 1976)
The genera Marasmiellus, Crepidotus and Simocybe in the neotropics by Rolf Singer (Cramer, 1973)
A monograph of Favolaschia by Rolf Singer (Cramer, 1974)
The Agaricales in modern taxonomy by Rolf Singer (J. Cramer, 1975)
Phaeocollybia (Cortinariaceae-Basidiomycetes). by Rolf Singer (Published for Organization for Flora Neotropica by Hafner Pub. Co., 1970)
Mycoflora Australis. by Rolf Singer (Cramer, 1969)
Die Röhrlinge. by Rolf Singer (J. Klinkhardt, 1965)

References

Other sources

Singer, Rolf. "Curriculum Vitae"

1906 births
1994 deaths
University of Vienna alumni
University of Virginia faculty
Harvard University people
Academic staff of the University of Buenos Aires
University of Illinois Chicago faculty
German mycologists
20th-century German botanists
People from Miesbach (district)
German expatriates in Austria
German emigrants to the United States